This is a list of electoral results for the electoral district of Berwick in Victorian state elections.

Members for Berwick

Election results

Elections in the 2020s

Elections in the 1990s

Elections in the 1980s

Elections in the 1970s

References

Victoria (Australia) state electoral results by district